These are The Official Charts Company UK Official Indie Chart number one hits of 1995.

See also
1995 in music

References

United Kingdom Indie Singles
Indie 1995
UK Indie Chart number-one singles